Rhododendron ericoides is a species of rhododendron native to Borneo. It is found only on Mount Kinabalu. It is native to subalpine and alpine shrublands above 2,600 meters elevation.

Rhododendron ericoides is an erect of prostrate shrub, growing up to 1.5 m tall and rarely to 3 m. It has small leaves, 0.4–0.8 cm long by 0.08–0.16 cm wide, and linear or very narrowly elliptic in shape.

References

ericoides
Plants described in 1851
Flora of Mount Kinabalu
Endemic flora of Borneo
Alpine flora